"Nothing at All" is a country song performed and written by Kasey Chambers and produced by her brother, Nash Chambers, released in July 2006 as the lead single from her fourth studio album Carnival (2006).

The song won the "Most Performed Country Work" at the APRA Music Awards of 2007 It was the third year in a row Chambers won this award. The song earned Chambers a nomination for ARIA Award for Best Female Artist at the ARIA Music Awards of 2006.

Track listing

Charts

Weekly charts

Year-end charts

References

2006 songs
2006 singles
Kasey Chambers songs
Songs written by Kasey Chambers